Ignacio Maestro Puch (born 13 August 2003) is an Argentine professional footballer who plays for Atlético Tucumán.

Club career 
Ignacio Maestro Puch made his professional debut for Atlético Tucumán on the 10 February against Sarmiento Junín.

References

External links

2003 births
Living people
Argentine footballers
Argentina youth international footballers
Association football forwards
Sportspeople from San Miguel de Tucumán
Atlético Tucumán footballers
Argentine Primera División players